The Ruf Dakara is a mid-size luxury crossover SUV based on the Porsche Cayenne and produced by German automobile manufacturer Ruf Automobile. The Dakara debuted at the Geneva Motor Show in 2009 with a base price of approximately $327,853 (€230,454).

Performance 

Features 
The most notable differences between the Dakara and the standard Cayenne is the headlamps, which are taken from a (911/997) model Porsche 911. On the exterior, it also has a Ruf body kit with a redesigned front end, widened fenders and 22 inch five spoke alloy wheels. On the interior, the Dakara features front and rear-facing cameras, redesigned leather seats, an LED lighting package and a high end multimedia system that features TV and phone reception, internet access, CD and DVD compatibility and an iPod interface.

External links
 Official website (German)
 When a Porsche Cayenne Turbo S Isn't Enough: The 591-hp, $327,853 Ruf Dakara

Dakara
Mid-size sport utility vehicles

References 

Cars introduced in 2009